The Augusta family is a small asteroid family in the inner asteroid belt according to a HCM-study conducted by Italian astronomer Vincenzo Zappalà and colleges in 1995. The largest members of this family include 254 Augusta (parent body) and 5535 Annefrank. In this study, a total of 23 members were identified out of a small data set of 12,487 asteroids. A more recent HCM-study by Nesvorný in 2014 no longer includes this family.

Members 

This is the complete list of members of the Augusta family as identified by Zappalà (1995). They are grouped into the larger complex of the Flora family by Nesvorný (2014), except for five asteroids, which were reassigned to the main belt's background population (marked as BG).

 254 Augusta
 1058 Grubba
 1608 Muñoz
 1830 Pogson
 2121 Sevastopol
 3355 Onizuka
 3813 Fortov
 5535 Annefrank
  
 5873 Archilochos
 6089 Izumi 
 
 6312 Robheinlein 
 6556 Arcimboldo
 8817 Roytraver
 9282 Lucylim 
 
 10760 Ozeki

References 
 

Asteroid groups and families